This list of spirals includes named spirals that have been described mathematically.

See also

 Catherine wheel (firework)
 List of spiral galaxies
 Parker spiral
 Spirangle
 Spirograph

References

Spirals